Mundowdna Station, most commonly known as Mundowdna, is a pastoral lease that operates as a cattle station in north east South Australia.

History
The lease for a run was first taken out in 1859 by T. and A. Matthews.

The name of the station is Aboriginal in origin and is taken from a water hole found in the area. The Governor of South Australia visited the area during a severe drought in 1859. E. Chapman established Mundowdna in 1860. Shortly afterwards the property, along with neighbouring St. Stephen's Pond were owned by the Matthews brothers, who complained about Aboriginal people killing their stock in 1863.

Edgar Chapman was in possession of Mundowdna in 1880 and had it stocked with cattle, selling 600 head in two lots at the Adelaide market. Presumably the property sold, and was owned by Edward Russell in 1886, who kept it until at least 1893. By 1896 the property was owned by Frank Whyte. Cattle and sheep had both been stocked on the property to this time.

In 1904 the property was put up for auction following the dissolution of a partnership where one partner, John Whyte, died. Mundowdna was offered along with neighbouring Lake Torrens station. The bidders included Sidney Kidman but the property was sold to Mr. W. Leslie Whyte for the sum of £10,700 along with all plant and stock. The property was not sold until later, in 1906, when it was purchased by Sidney Kidman. Kidman acquired the property as it lies at the southern end of the Birdsville Track and close to the railway terminus at Marree.

The property was struck by drought in 1908 and Kidman had his store cattle sent north by rail on a special train to The Peake to find feed and water.

Over 2,000 horses were destroyed at Mundowdna over seven months in 1925 after horse-breeding had become unprofitable.

In 1930 the station received its best rain for 20 years, with  falling over a short period. Creeks were running and dams were full after the drought-breaking falls.

The family arrived in the area in 1958 and raise Santa Gertrudis cattle for the local beef market as well as merino sheep. Recently Dorper sheep have been introduced to produce salt bush mutton.

The land occupying the extent of the Mundowdna Station pastoral lease was gazetted as a locality by the Government of South Australia on 26 April 2013 under the name "Mundowdna".

See also
List of ranches and stations

References

Stations (Australian agriculture)
Pastoral leases in South Australia
Far North (South Australia)
1860 establishments in Australia